The Ruwenzori four-toed skink (Leptosiaphos meleagris) is a species of lizard in the family Scincidae. It is found in Africa.

References

Leptosiaphos
Reptiles described in 1907
Taxa named by George Albert Boulenger